Kuha may refer to:

 Qwiha, a town in Ethiopia
 KUHA, a predecessor of the KHVU radio of Houston, US
 Kuha, two classes of Finnish Navy minesweepers:
 Kuha-class minesweeper (1941)
 Kuha-class minesweeper (1974)
 Jouko Kuha, Finnish long-distance runner
 Kuha, Finland, a village in the municipality of Ranua, Finland
 Kuha (Internet meme), a Finnish Internet meme

See also 
 Kuhe (disambiguation)